Longhorn cattle may refer to:
 English Longhorn, a traditional long horned brown and white breed of cattle
 Texas Longhorn, a breed of cattle related to the cattle brought to Texas, California, and Florida by the Spanish
 Highland cattle, a Scottish breed sometimes called Highland longhorn